The 2007 BWF World Junior Championships was an international badminton tournament held in Waitakere City, New Zealand.

The team competition was held from 25 to 28 October, and the individual events were from 30 October to 4 November 2007.

Medalists

Team competition
A total of 25 countries competed at the team competition in 2007 BWF World Junior Championships.

Final positions

Final round

Individual competitions

Boys Singles

Seeded

  Mohd Arif Abdul Latif (quarter-final)
  Chen Long (champion)
  Lim Fang Yang (fourth round)
  Dennis Prehn (second round)
  Kieran Merrilees (third round)
  Kenichi Tago (final)
  Ivan Sozonov (fourth round)
  Park Sung-Min (quarter-final)
  Emil Holst (second round)
  Sebastian Rduch (third round)
  Zhang Qi (second round)
  Derek Wong Zi Liang (fourth round)
  Teo Kok Siang (fourth round)
  Nandang Arif (quarter-final)
  Huseyin Durakcan (third round)
  Tanongsak Saensomboonsuk (third round)

Finals

Top half

Section 1

Section 2

Section 3

Section 4

Bottom half

Section 5

Section 6

Section 7

Section 8

Girls Singles

Seeded

  Xing Aiying (second round)
  Liu Xin (semi-final)
  Wang Lin (champion)
  Anne Hald Jensen (third round)
  Patty Stolzenbach (second round)
  Fu Mingtian (third round)
  Linda Sloan (quarter-final)
  Pia Zebadiah Bernadet (quarter-final)
  Fabienne Deprez (second round)
  Bae Youn-Joo (final)
  Lyddia Cheah (fourth round)
  Gu Juan (semi-final)
  Porntip Buranaprasertsuk (fourth round)
  Zhang Beiwen (third round)
  Tee Jing Yi (third round)
  Wong Yik Man (third round)

Finals

Top half

Section 1

Section 2

Section 3

Section 4

Bottom half

Section 5

Section 6

Section 7

Section 8

Boys Doubles

Seeded

  Li Tian / Chai Biao (final)
  Lim Khim Wah / Mak Hee Chun (semi-final)
  Chris Adcock / Marcus Ellis (quarter-final)
  Zhang Nan / Qiu Zihan (quarter-final)
  Afiat Yuris Wirawan / Wifqi Windarto (quarter-final)
  Mikkel Elbjorn Larsen / Emil Holst (third round)
  Sebastian Rduch / Josche Zurwonne (third round)
  Ong Jian Guo / Goh V Shem (semi-final)

Finals

Section 1

Section 2

Section 3

Section 4

Girls Doubles

Seeded

  Richi Puspita Dili / Debby Susanto (quarter-final)
  Yoo Hyun-Young / Jung Kyung-Eun (final)
  Gu Juan / Zhang Beiwen (second round)
  Yao Lei / Fu Mingtian (third round)
  Shizuka Uchida / Ayane Kurihara (third round)
  Lee Se-Rang / Eom Hye-Won (second round)
  Samantha Ward / Gabrielle White (quarter-final)
  Anne Skelbaek / Maria Helsbol (second round)

Finals

Section 1

Section 2

Section 3

Section 4

Mixed doubles

Seeded

  Tan Wee Kiong / Woon Khe Wei (fourth round)
  Lim Khim Wah / Ng Hui Lin (champion)
  Chris Adcock / Gabrielle White (final)
  Mikkel Elbjorn Larsen / Anne Skelbaek (second round)
  Marcus Ellis / Samantha Ward (third round)
  Terry Yeo Zhao Jiang / Yao Lei (fourth round)
  Mohd Lutfi Zaim Abdul Khalid / Goh Liu Ying (quarter-final)
  Josche Zurwonne / Dana Kaufhold (third round)
  Kieran Merrilees / Linda Sloan (second round)
  Henrik Fahlstrom / Amanda Hogstrom (third round)
  Boris Ma / Victoria Na (second round)
  Shin Baek-cheol / Yoo Hyun-Young (semi-final)
  Delius Tang / Kritteka Gregory (second round)
  Afiat Yuris Wirawan / Debby Susanto (semi-final)
  Hector Rios / Keara Gonzalez (second round)
  Cheng Po-Hsuan / Peng Hsiao-Chu (third round)

Finals

Top half

Section 1

Section 2

Section 3

Section 4

Bottom half

Section 5

Section 6

Section 7

Section 8

Medal account

References

External links
World Junior Team Championship 2007 at Tournamentsoftware.com
World Junior Championships 2007 at Tournamentsoftware.com

BWF World Junior Championships
BWF World Junior Championships
BWF World Junior Championships
B
Badminton tournaments in New Zealand
2007 in youth sport